Mum's the Word is a Canadian documentary short film, directed by Paul Carrière and released on September 10, 1996. The film centres on Rachel, Suzanne, Jeannine and Paulette, four Franco-Ontarian women in their mid-40s in Sudbury, Ontario, who, after marrying and raising children, are in the process of coming out as lesbian.

The film won the Genie Award for Best Short Documentary Film at the 17th Genie Awards.

The film premiered at the Montreal World Film Festival in August 1996, and was screened at the 1996 Toronto International Film Festival and the Cinéfest Sudbury International Film Festival in September.

The film received a 20th anniversary screening at Sudbury's Queer North Film Festival in 2017. Paulette Gagnon, the development director of the city's Place des Arts project and the only one of the four women whose full name is known on the record, participated in media interviews to promote the screening; she also appeared in a smaller capacity in the 1999 documentary film The Pinco Triangle. Gagnon died in October 2017, several months after the film screening, and the film was screened again at the Junction North International Documentary Film Festival in November 2017 as a memorial tribute to Gagnon.

References

External links
 

1996 films
1996 documentary films
Canadian short documentary films
Canadian LGBT-related short films
Documentary films about lesbians
1996 LGBT-related films
Films shot in Greater Sudbury
Best Short Documentary Film Genie and Canadian Screen Award winners
National Film Board of Canada short films
National Film Board of Canada documentaries
Quebec films
French-language Canadian films
1990s Canadian films